Saint-Aubin-du-Cormier is a commune in the Ille-et-Vilaine department in Brittany in northwestern France.

Geography

The bordering communes are Mézières-sur-Couesnon, Saint-Jean-sur-Couesnon, Saint-Georges-de-Chesné, Mecé, Livré-sur-Changeon, Liffré, Gosné, Ercé-près-Liffré, and Gahard.

History
The area is most notable for the 1488 Battle of Saint-Aubin-du-Cormier, the decisive conflict of the guerre folle between rebellious feudal aristocrats and the French king. The rebels sought to resist the concentration of power in Paris and retain regional feudal independence.  The combined rebel forces were defeated, paving the way for the creation of a unified French state.

The area was also the site of conflict during the Chouannerie, anti-Revolutionary insurrections in the 1790s.

Population
Inhabitants of Saint-Aubin-du-Cormier are called saint-aubinais in French.

See also
Communes of the Ille-et-Vilaine department

References

External links

Official site 
Geography of Brittany 

Communes of Ille-et-Vilaine